The Vice President of the National Assembly of Quebec (French; Le Vice-président de l'Assemblée nationale) is the deputy speaker of the National Assembly of Quebec, Canada, which is modeled after the Westminster parliamentary system. The President of the National Assembly is fourteenth in the Quebec order of precedence.

Description
The position of Vice President was created in 1909, with a second Vice President being added in 1973 and a third in 1999. Currently, two Vice Presidents are elected from the ruling party (or coalition) and one from the opposition. They are elected by their colleagues at the beginning of a legislature, and serve until a successor is elected. The Vice President assists the President of the Assembly, and can replace the President in the case of their absence. The Vice Presidents generally preside over routine proceedings. They rarely take part in debate, although they can still cast votes. The current Vice Presidents of the Assembly are Liberals Francois Ouimet and Maryse Gaudreault and péquiste Francois Gendron.

List of vice presidents of the National Assembly of Quebec
Dates are derived from the National Assembly's listing of Vice Presidents and their linked profiles.

One officeholder (1909–1973)

Two officeholders (1973–1999)

Three officeholders (1999–present)

Vice presidents for the majority

Vice president for the opposition

References

Politics of Quebec
Lists of political office-holders in Quebec